This is a comprehensive list of victories of the  cycling team. The races are categorized according to the UCI rules.

2006 – DSB Bank–Ballast Nedam

Cyclo-cross race in Pétange, Marianne Vos
Stage 5, Gracia–Orlová, Marianne Vos
Omloop van Borsele, Marianne Vos
Stage 1, Emakumeen Bira, Marianne Vos
Omloop van Valkenburg, Marianne Vos
 Overall Tour Féminin en Limousin, Marianne Vos
Stage 1 and Stage 3, Marianne Vos
Criterium Steenwijk, Marianne Vos
Draai van de Kaai, Marianne Vos
Profronde van Oostvoorne, Marianne Vos
Criterium Pijnacker, Marianne Vos
Stage 4, Trophée d'Or Féminin, Marianne Vos

2007 – DSB–Bank

UCI Women's Road World Cup, Marianne Vos
La Flèche Wallonne Féminine (World Cup), Marianne Vos
Rund um die Nürnberger Altstadt, Marianne Vos
Ronde van Gelderland, Marianne Vos
Overall Gracia–Orlová, Andrea Bosman
Overall, Giro di San Marino Marianne Vos
Stage 1 ITT, 2 & 3 Giro di San Marino, Marianne Vos
Omloop van Borsele, Marianne Vos
Stage 1, 3, 4 & 7 Tour de l'Aude Cycliste Féminin, Marianne Vos
Stage 2 & 3 Emakumeen Bira, Marianne Vos
Overall Rabobank Ster Zeeuwsche Eilanden, Marianne Vos
Stage 1 & 2, Marianne Vos
Stage 2, Giro d'Italia Femminile, Marianne Vos
Profronde van Surhuisterveen, Adrie Visser
Ronde van Drenthe (World Cup), Adrie Visser
Profronde van Oostvoorne, Marianne Vos
Holland Hills Classic, Marianne Vos
Gouden Pijl Emmen, Christina Mods
Stage 1 & 4 Holland Ladies Tour, Marianne Vos

2008 – DSB–Bank

Dolmans Heuvelland Classic, Sharon Van Essen
Grand Prix de Dottignies, Marianne Vos
La Flèche Wallonne Féminine, Marianne Vos
Overall Gracia–Orlová, Marianne Vos
Stage 1, 2 & 3, Marianne Vos
Grand Prix de Santa Ana, Marianne Vos
Prologue, Stage 1 & 2 Vuelta Ciclista Femenina a el Salvador, Marianne Vos
Overall Emakumeen Bira, Marianne Vos
Stage 1, 2, 3a & 4, Marianne Vos
Overall Tour de Feminin — Krasna Lipa, Angela Brodtka-Hennig
Stage 2 & 3, Marianne Vos
Stage 4, Angela Brodtka-Hennig
Stage 1 Women's Tour of Britain, Andrea Bosman
Stage 1 International Thüringen Rundfahrt der Frauen, Angela Brodtka-Hennig
Stage 2 Albstadt-Frauen-Etappenrennen, Adrie Visser
Stage 2a Giro della Toscana Femminile, Marianne Vos

2009 – DSB Bank–LTO

Trofeo Alfredo Binda, Marianne Vos
Novilon Eurocup Ronde van Drenthe, Marianne Vos
La Flèche Wallonne Féminine, Marianne Vos
Stage 1 Gracia–Orlová, Marianne Vos
Stage 4 & 7 Tour de l'Aude Cycliste Féminin, Marianne Vos
7-Dorpenomloop Aalburg, Marianne Vos
Stage 4 Grande Boucle féminine, Marianne Vos
Overall Women's Tour of Britain, Liesbet De Vocht
Stage 1, Liesbet De Vocht
Stage 2, Janneke Kanis
Stage 3, 4a & 4b, Marianne Vos
Open de Suède Vårgårda, Marianne Vos
Draai van de Kaai, Marianne Vos
Ronde van Maastricht, Marianne Vos
Profronde van Oostvoorne, Marianne Vos
Holland Ladies Tour, Marianne Vos
Stage 4 & 5 Tour Cycliste Féminin International Ardèche, Angela Brodtka-Hennig
Stage 4 & 6 Giro della Toscana Femminile, Marianne Vos

2010 – Nederland Bloeit

Trofeo Alfredo Binda, Marianne Vos
Dolmans Heuvelland Classic, Liesbet De Vocht
Ronde van Drenthe, Loes Gunnewijk
Novilon Eurocup Ronde van Drenthe, Annemiek van Vleuten
 Overall Gracia–Orlová, Marianne Vos
Stage 1, 4 & 5, Marianne Vos
Stage 2, Annemiek van Vleuten
Stage 8 Tour de l'Aude Cycliste Féminin, Marianne Vos
7-Dorpenomloop Aalburg, Marianne Vos
Durango-Durango Emakumeen Saria, Marianne Vos
Stage 1 & 3b Emakumeen Bira, Marianne Vos
Stage 4 Emakumeen Bira, Annemiek van Vleuten
Stage 3 Rabobank Ster Zeeuwsche Eilanden, Janneke Kanis
Stage 5 & 6 Giro d'Italia Femminile, Marianne Vos
Dwars door de Westhoek, Liesbet De Vocht
Draai van de Kaai, Marianne Vos
Ronde van Maastricht, Marianne Vos
Profronde van Oostvoorne, Marianne Vos
Overall Route de France, Annemiek van Vleuten
Stages 3 & 6, Marianne Vos
Stage 4, Annemiek van Vleuten
Overall Holland Ladies Tour, Marianne Vos
Stage 3 & 7, Marianne Vos
Stage 4 Giro della Toscana Femminile, Marianne Vos

2011 – Nederland Bloeit

Stage 1 & 4 Energiewacht Tour, Marianne Vos
Drentse 8 van Dwingeloo, Marianne Vos
Ronde van Drenthe, Marianne Vos
La Flèche Wallonne Féminine, Marianne Vos
Grand Prix Elsy Jacobs, Marianne Vos
Grand-Prix Nicolas Frantz, Marianne Vos
7-Dorpenomloop Aalburg, Marianne Vos
Gooik, Marianne Vos
G.P. Ciudad de Valladolid, Marianne Vos
Durango-Durango Emakumeen Saria, Marianne Vos
Overall Iurreta-Emakumeen Bira, Marianne Vos
Stages 1, 2 & 4, Marianne Vos
Overall Rabobank Ster Zeeuwsche Eilanden, Marianne Vos
Prologue & Stage 2, Marianne Vos
 Overall Giro d'Italia Femminile, Marianne Vos
Stages 1, 3, 6, 7 & 9, Marianne Vos
 Points classification, Marianne Vos
 Mountain classification, Marianne Vos
Acht van Chaam, Marianne Vos
Open de Suède Vårgårda, Annemiek van Vleuten
Ronde van Maastricht, Marianne Vos
Profronde van Oostvoorne, Marianne Vos
Trophée d'Or Féminin, Marianne Vos
Overall Holland Ladies Tour, Marianne Vos
Stages 1, 5 & 6, Marianne Vos
Stage 3, Loes Gunnewijk

2012 – Stichting Rabo Women Cycling Team / Rabobank Women Cycling Team

Ronde van Drenthe, Marianne Vos
Novilon Eurocup Ronde van Drenthe, Marianne Vos
Trofeo Alfredo Binda, Marianne Vos
GP Stad Roeselare, Annemiek van Vleuten
 Overall Festival Luxembourgeois du cyclisme féminin Elsy Jacobs, Marianne Vos
Prologue & Stage 2, Annemiek van Vleuten
Stage 1, Marianne Vos
Bredene, Liesbet De Vocht
Gooik, Liesbet De Vocht
GP Comune di Cornaredo, Iris Slappendel
Holland Hills Classic, Annemiek van Vleuten
7-Dorpenomloop Aalburg, Annemiek van Vleuten
Stage 4, Iurreta-Emakumeen Bira, Annemiek van Vleuten
Stage 1, Rabobank Ster Zeeuwsche Eilanden, Iris Slappendel
 Overall Giro d'Italia Femminile, Marianne Vos
Stage 1, 2, 4, 7, & 8 Marianne Vos
Overall Tour Féminin en Limousin, Marianne Vos
Stage 1, Marianne Vos
Stage 4, Marianne Vos
 Olympic Road Championship, Marianne Vos
2011 Open de Suède Vårgårda, Iris Slappendel
GP de Plouay, Marianne Vos
Prologue Giro della Toscana Femminile, Annemiek van Vleuten
Overall BrainWash Ladies Tour, Marianne Vos
Stage 4, Marianne Vos
Stage 6, Marianne Vos

2013 – Rabobank–Liv Giant

Drentse 8 van Dwingeloo, Marianne Vos
Ronde van Drenthe, Marianne Vos
Tour of Flanders – WE, Marianne Vos
 Youth classification Energiewacht Tour, Jolanda Neff
2013 La Flèche Wallonne Féminine, Marianne Vos
 Overall Festival Luxembourgeois du cyclisme féminin Elsy Jacobs, Marianne Vos
 Points classification, Marianne Vos
Prologue, Annemiek van Vleuten
Stage 2, Marianne Vos
Rabobank 7-Dorpenomloop Aalburg, Marianne Vos
Durango-Durango Emakumeen Saria, Marianne Vos
 Points classification Emakumeen Euskal Bira, Marianne Vos
Stage 1, Marianne Vos
 Points classification Giro Rosa, Marianne Vos
Stages 3, 4 & 7, Marianne Vos
Stage 3 Thüringen Rundfahrt der Frauen, Annemiek van Vleuten
Open de Suède Vårgårda, Marianne Vos
 Overall Trophée d'Or Féminin, Marianne Vos
Stages 1, 2 & 4, Marianne Vos
Stage 6, Annemiek van Vleuten
GP de Plouay, Marianne Vos
Individual ranking UCI Women's Road World Cup, Marianne Vos
Teams ranking UCI Women's Road World Cup
Prologue & Stage 2 Giro della Toscana Int. Femminile – Memorial Michela Fanini, Marianne Vos
Hertogenbosch Cyclo-cross, Marianne Vos
Round 1 UCI Cyclo-cross World Cup (Valkenberg), Marianne Vos
Woerden Cyclo-cross, Marianne Vos
Flamanville Cyclo-cross, Pauline Ferrand-Prévot

2014 – Rabo–Liv Women Cycling Team

Surhuisterveen Cyclo-cross, Marianne Vos
Leuven Cyclo-cross, Marianne Vos
Nommay Cyclo-cross, Marianne Vos
 Overall Energiewacht Tour, Lucinda Brand
 Young rider classification, Thalita de Jong
Stage 4, Lucinda Brand
La Flèche Wallonne Féminine, Pauline Ferrand-Prévot
Dwars door de Westhoek, Anna van der Breggen
 Overall Festival Luxembourgeois du cyclisme féminin Elsy Jacobs, Anna van der Breggen
 Points classification, Marianne Vos
 Mountains classification, Pauline Ferrand-Prévot
 Youth classification, Pauline Ferrand-Prévot
Prologue & Stage 2, Marianne Vos
Stage 1, Anna van der Breggen
 Overall The Women's Tour, Marianne Vos
 Points classification, Marianne Vos
Stages 3, 4 & 5, Marianne Vos
Lons-le-Saunier (Mountainbike), Pauline Ferrand-Prévot
Nove Mesto na Morave (Mountainbike), Pauline Ferrand-Prévot
Rabobank 7-Dorpenomloop Aalburg, Marianne Vos
Albstadt (Mountainbike), Pauline Ferrand-Prévot
Gooik–Geraardsbergen–Gooik, Marianne Vos
Durango-Durango Emakumeen Saria, Marianne Vos
 Overall Emakumeen Euskal Bira, Pauline Ferrand-Prévot
 Points classification, Marianne Vos
 Mountains classification, Anna van der Breggen
Teams classification
Stages 1 & 3, Pauline Ferrand-Prévot
Stages 2 & 4, Marianne Vos
GP du Canton d'Argovie, Katarzyna Niewiadoma
 Overall Giro d'Italia Femminile, Marianne Vos
 Points classification, Marianne Vos
 Young rider classification, Pauline Ferrand-Prévot
Prologue & Stage 3, Annemiek van Vleuten
Stages 1, 4, 5 & 7, Marianne Vos
La Course by Le Tour de France, Marianne Vos
Sparkassen Giro, Marianne Vos
 Overall Ladies Tour of Norway, Anna van der Breggen
 Points classification, Anna van der Breggen
 Mountains classification, Katarzyna Niewiadoma
 Youth classification, Katarzyna Niewiadoma
Teams classification
Prologue & Stage 2, Marianne Vos
Stage 1, Anna van der Breggen
Stage 7 La Route de France, Iris Slappendel
GP de Plouay, Lucinda Brand
Teams classification UCI Women's Road World Cup
Sprints classification UCI Women's Road World Cup, Iris Slappendel
 Mountains classification Boels Rental Ladies Tour, Katarzyna Niewiadoma
  Combativity award Stage 6, Roxane Knetemann
Stage 3, Marianne Vos
 Overall Lotto Belisol Belgium Tour, Annemiek van Vleuten
 Sprints classification, Thalita de Jong
 Mountains classification, Anna van der Breggen
 Young rider classification, Thalita de Jong
Teams classification
Prologue & Stage 1, Annemiek van Vleuten
Stage 2, TTT
Stage 4, Anna van der Breggen
Zilvermeercross, Sabrina Stultiens
Coupe de France Cycliste de Cyclo-Cross – Lanarvily, Pauline Ferrand-Prévot
UCI Cyclo-cross World Cup – Zolder, Marianne Vos
Superprestige – Diegem, Marianne Vos

2015 – Rabo–Liv Women Cycling Team

Internationale Centrumcross van Surhuisterveen, Marianne Vos
Omloop Het Nieuwsblad, Anna van der Breggen
Prologue & Stage 4 Energiewacht Tour, Anna van der Breggen
Stage 2b Energiewacht Tour, Lucinda Brand
La Flèche Wallonne Féminine, Anna van der Breggen
 Overall Festival Luxembourgeois du cyclisme féminin Elsy Jacobs, Anna van der Breggen
Prologue, Anna van der Breggen
 Overall Emakumeen Euskal Bira, Katarzyna Niewiadoma
 Overall Giro d'Italia Femminile, Anna van der Breggen
 Young rider classification, Katarzyna Niewiadoma
Stages 3 & 7, Lucinda Brand
Stage 5, Pauline Ferrand-Prévot
Stage 8 (ITT), Anna van der Breggen
La Course by Le Tour de France, Anna van der Breggen
Erondegemse Pijl, Thalita de Jong
Crescent Women World Cup Vårgårda, Team time trial
Stage 6 Holland Ladies Tour, Thalita de Jong
Stage 4 Belgium Tour, Anna van der Breggen

2016 – Rabo–Liv Women Cycling Team

Pajot Hills Classic, Marianne Vos
Salverda Omloop van de IJsseldelta, Anna van der Breggen
Ronde van Gelderland, Katarzyna Niewiadoma
La Flèche Wallonne Féminine, Anna van der Breggen
 Overall Grand Prix Elsy Jacobs, Katarzyna Niewiadoma
 Young rider classification, Katarzyna Niewiadoma
Stage 2, Katarzyna Niewiadoma
Rabobank 7-Dorpenomloop Aalburg, Marianne Vos
Stage 3 Tour of California, Marianne Vos
Keukens Van Lommel Ladies Classic, Marianne Vos
Stage 4 The Womens Tour, Marianne Vos 
 Overall Giro del Trentino Alto Adige-Südtirol, Katarzyna Niewiadoma
Stage 1, Katarzyna Niewiadoma
Stage 2a, Thalita de Jong
Stage 2b (TTT)
Stage 9 Giro d'Italia Internazionale Femminile, Katarzyna Niewiadoma
Stages 1, 3 & 5 Internationale Thüringen Rundfahrt der Frauen, Marianne Vos 
 Points classification Lotto–Belisol Belgium Tour, Marianne Vos 
 Sprints classification, Marianne Vos 
Stage 2, Marianne Vos 
Erondegemse Pijl (Erpe-Mere), Lucinda Brand
 Overall Ladies Tour of Norway, Lucinda Brand
 Points classification, Anouska Koster
 Youth classification, Thalita de Jong
Teams classification
Stage 2, Lucinda Brand
Stage 3, Anouska Koster
Stage 3 Boels Rental Ladies Tour, Katarzyna Niewiadoma
Cauberg Cyclo-cross, Thalita de Jong
Grand Prix Eric De Vlaeminck, Marianne Vos

2017 – WM3 Pro Cycling

Grand Prix Sven Nys, Marianne Vos 
Memorial Romano Scotti, Marianne Vos 
Grand Prix Adrie van der Poel, Marianne Vos 
 Overall Bay Classic Series, Valentina Scandolara
Stage 1, Valentina Scandolara
EPZ Omloop van Borsele, Riejanne Markus
 Overall Gracia–Orlová, Riejanne Markus
Stages 1 & 3 (ITT), Riejanne Markus
Stage 2, Anouska Koster
Trofee Maarten Wynants, Marianne Vos 
Rabobank 7-Dorpenomloop Aalburg, Marianne Vos 
 Overall The Women's Tour, Katarzyna Niewiadoma
Stage 1, Katarzyna Niewiadoma
 Overall BeNe Ladies Tour, Marianne Vos 
 Points classification, Marianne Vos 
 Sprints classification, Marianne Vos 
Stages 2b (ITT) & 3, Marianne Vos 
 Overall Ladies Tour of Norway, Marianne Vos 
 Points classification, Marianne Vos
 Combativity classification, Stage 6 Holland Ladies Tour, Katarzyna Niewiadoma
 Overall Lotto Belisol Belgium Tour, Anouska Koster
 Points classification, Marianne Vos 
 Youth classification, Anouska Koster
Team classification
Stage 1, Marianne Vos 
Stage 3, Anouska Koster

2018 – WaowDeals Pro Cycling

 Youth classification Women's Herald Sun Tour, Jeanne Korevaar
Time Trial, District Kampioenschap Zuid-Oost/Zuid-West, Pauliena Rooijakkers
Stage 1 Emakumeen Euskal Bira, Sabrina Stultiens
 Points classification The Women's Tour, Marianne Vos 
 British rider classification, Dani Rowe
Team classification
Stage 8 Giro Rosa, Marianne Vos 
 Overall BeNe Ladies Tour, Marianne Vos 
 Sprints classification, Marianne Vos
 Points classification, Marianne Vos
Stage 1, Marianne Vos
Open de Suède Vårgårda, Marianne Vos 
 Overall Ladies Tour of Norway, Marianne Vos 
 Points classification, Marianne Vos
Stages 1, 2 & 3, Marianne Vos 
Stage 2 Belgium Tour, Jeanne Korevaar

2019 – CCC–Liv
Trofeo Alfredo Binda – Comune di Cittiglio, Marianne Vos 
 Overall Tour de Yorkshire Women's Race, Marianne Vos 
Stage 2, Marianne Vos 
Stage 1 Festival Elsy Jacobs, Marta Lach
 Mountains classification Thüringen Rundfahrt der Frauen, Pauliena Rooijakkers
Stage 2 The Women's Tour, Marianne Vos 
Stages 2, 3 & 7 Giro Rosa, Marianne Vos 
La Course by Le Tour de France, Marianne Vos 
Emakumeen Nafarroako Klasikoa, Ashleigh Moolman
 Overall Ladies Tour of Norway, Marianne Vos 
Stages 2, 3 & 4, Marianne Vos 
 Overall Tour Cycliste Féminin International de l'Ardèche, Marianne Vos 
 Points classification, Marianne Vos 
Stages 1, 2, 3, 6 & 7, Marianne Vos

2020 – CCC–Liv
 National Road Race Championships, Ashleigh Moolman

2021 – Liv Racing
Le Samyn, Lotte Kopecky 
Stage 1 Holland Ladies Tour, Alison Jackson
La Classique Morbihan, Sofia Bertizzolo

2022 – Liv Racing–Xstra
Stage 3 Bloeizone Fryslân Tour, Rachele Barbieri  
ZLM Omloop der Kempen Ladies, Rachele Barbieri

Rabo-Liv Women Cycling Team
DSB